Joseph F. Flores (August 12, 1900 – December 18, 1981) was a Guamanian newspaper publisher and politician. Flores was the fourth civilian appointed Governor of Guam, and was the first Chamorro to hold the office. He also founded the island's first locally owned newspaper, the Guam Daily News (later becoming the Pacific Daily News), which was the only local newspaper until 1966. He enjoyed success running many publications before being appointed Governor by President Dwight D. Eisenhower in 1960. As Governor, Flores pushed for increased self-governance in Guam, resigning in 1961. After his Governorship, Flores founded other businesses and became involved in numerous community organizations. He was a Knight of St. Sylvester.

Life and career

Early life
Flores was born on August 12, 1900, in Hagåtña, Guam, and received all of his education on the island. As a teenager, Flores worked for the United States Navy government in Guam as a messenger, and an operator at the Naval cable station. During World War I, Flores enlisted in the Navy, though he never saw combat. After leaving the Navy, Flores moved to San Francisco and married his wife Angela.

Publishing career
While in San Francisco, Flores opened a small print shop and began printing a four-page weekly newspaper, the South of the Market Street Tribune. The South of the Market Tribune turned a good profit until the Great Depression and a printing worker's strike forced it out of business. However, by the end of World War II, Flores ran and published five newspapers.

Flores returned to Guam in 1947 to partner with his brothers Joaquin and Jesus Flores in an import company called Flores Brothers in Hagåtña. Upon his return, he purchased the Naval newspaper publication Guam News for $37,000 in 1950, renaming it the Guam Daily News and making Flores the first local newspaper publisher in Guam. Later, Flores began publishing the Territorial Sun, a Sunday newspaper, and continued publishing for twenty years, when he sold the Guam Daily News to Chin Ho for $1.2 million, who later sold it to Gannett Company.

Personal life
Flores was married to Angela Perez Flores and had one child named Edward.

Governorship
President Eisenhower appointed Flores Governor of Guam in 1960, making Flores the first locally born Chamorro to hold the office. His nomination followed the resignations of Richard Barrett Lowe and the subsequent acting governor Marcellus Boss. During his governorship, Flores pushed for Guamanian self-governance and a Delegate from Guam to the United States, and opened public health centers in various locations. In addition, he aided in making the University of Guam a land-grant university. When John F. Kennedy, a Democrat, became president, Flores resigned on May 20, 1961, as a courtesy, after only one year in office.

Post-governorship
After leaving office, Flores founded a number of companies, including the Guam Savings and Loan Association in 1954, now named BankPacific and run by his grandson Phillip Flores, Mariannas Finance Corporation, Pacific American Insurance Company, and Guam Air Lines, and owned a number of office buildings and apartment buildings. In addition to his entrepreneurial work, Flores served on a number of boards, including chairing the University of Guam Board of Regents and the Territorial Planning Commission, and a member of the Guam Chamber of Commerce, Young Men's League of Guam, and the Elks Club. He died on December 18, 1981, by his long illness at the age of 81.

Awards and legacy

Flores was a Knight of St. Sylvester and was inducted into the Guam Chamber of Commerce Hall of Fame in 1992. In the 1960s, Governor Joseph F. Flores Beach Park was named in his honor.

References

Additional sources
 Babauta, Leo, Joseph Flores, Guampedia

External links 
 Joseph Flores at Guampedia.com
 Joseph F. Flores at ourcampaigns.com
 Joseph F. Flores at findagrave.com

1900 births
1981 deaths
Governors of Guam
Chamorro people
People from Hagåtña, Guam
Knights of the Order of St. Sylvester
United States Navy personnel of World War I
Politicians from San Francisco
American publishers (people)
American financiers
Businesspeople in insurance
Guamanian military personnel
Guamanian Republicans
Guamanian Roman Catholics
20th-century American businesspeople
Catholics from California